Saaf is a surname, and people with the surname include:

 Abdallah Saaf (born 1949), Moroccan academic and politician
 Art Saaf (1921–2007), American comics artist
 Per-Anders Sääf (born 1965), Swedish volleyball player
 Randy Saaf, American businessman and activist